Michael Angelus Hoban (born January 9, 1952) is a former American football player. A native of Chicago, Illinois, Hoban played high school football for Gordon Tech High School.  He played college football as an offensive guard for the University of Michigan from 1971 to 1973.  As a junior, he started all 11 games at offensive left guard for the 1972 Michigan Wolverines football team that finished with a 10-1 record, ranked No. 6 in the final AP Poll.   As a senior, he helped lead the 1973 Michigan Wolverines football team to an undefeated 10-0-1 record and was selected as an All-Big Ten Conference player.  After his senior year, Hoban was selected to play for the northern all-star team in the December 1973 Blue–Gray Football Classic.  Hoban played as a guard for the Chicago Bears during the 1974 NFL season. Hoban and his family appeared in multiple episodes of the Family Feud, with Richard Dawson as host.

References

1952 births
Living people
American football offensive guards
Michigan Wolverines football players
Chicago Bears players
Players of American football from Chicago